Bolton Parish Church may refer to:

 Bolton Parish Church, East Lothian, Scotland.
 Bolton Parish Church (formally St Peter's Church, Bolton), Greater Manchester, England.

See also
 Bolton (disambiguation)